Southern Serbia or sometimes referred to as Southeastern Serbia, Southern Pomoravlje, South of Central Serbia, historically known as New Serbia or New Territories is a macroregion in Republic of Serbia which most often refers to the territories of Nišava, Toplica, Jablanica, Pčinja and Pirot Districts. This region occupies about 14,000 square kilometers and is home to about 1,000,000 people. More than a quarter of the population in the region lives in the city of Niš.

Southern Serbia is not an official subdivision of Serbia, nor are its borders precisely defined. The region is characterized by the South Morava river, which flows almost entirely through Southern Serbia and which has historically connected the peoples who lived in its basin. The region is defined by a common history and culture.

Term 
Today, Southern Serbia is a region in the south of the Republic of Serbia, and over time, the term has changed its meaning.

During the first half of the 20th century, the term was used to denote the area of Vardar Macedonia, Kosovo, Metohija and the Raška regions (so called Old Serbia). In the period from 1919 to 1922, this area formed the province of Southern Serbia within the Kingdom of Serbs Croats and Slovenes. In the same period, there was the province of Northern Serbia, which together with the South formed the province of Serbia. After the territorial reorganization, after the Second World War, this term was not actively used, since the People's Republic of Macedonia and the Autonomous Region of Kosovo and Metohija were formed in the then larger part of Southern Serbia, while the remaining part began to be called Southern Serbia, Southern Central Serbia or Southeastern Serbia. Today, it consists of the following districts: Nišava, Jablanica, Toplica, Pirot and Pčinja.

Modern day Southern Serbia changed its name throughout history. Majority of the region was liberated during Serbian–Turkish Wars in 1878 and was referred to as New Serbia or New Territories.

River of South Morava runs though the whole territory of Southern Serbia from Ražanj to Bujanovac. The river cuts the region in the middle into two parts. The basin of South Morava occupies approximately the same territory as the region of commonly considered to be Southern Serbia. Therefore,  Southern Serbia is sometimes referred to as Southern Pomoravlje.

History

Antiquity 
During pre-Roman era, region of Southern Pomoravlje was part of Kingdom of Dardania. However, Dardania was conquered by Roman Empire during Bellum Dardanicum in the first century AD. Region became part of Moesia Superior, and later Dardania. Several Roman Emperors were born in Niš(then Naissus), most notably Constantine the Great - first Christian Roman Emperor and founder of Constantinople(present-day Istanbul). In 364 AD, the imperial Villa Mediana  was the site where emperors Valentinian and Valens met and divided the Roman Empire into halves which they would rule as co-emperors. Emperor Justinian I was born near Leskovac, where he later founded Justiniana Prima.

Middle-Age

Modern Period 
During the First Serbian Uprising in 1809, Serbian revolutionaries attempted to liberate Niš in the Battle of Čegar. After the defeat of the Serbian forces, the Ottoman commander of Niš ordered the heads of the slain Serbs mounted on a tower to serve as a warning. The structure became known as Skull Tower. After Serbia gained autonomy within the borders of the Belgrade pashaluk, the aspiration of Serbs from the south to join the motherland increased. This led to Niš conspiracy in 1821 and Niš rebellion in 1841. From 1846 to 1864 modern Southern Serbia was a part of Ottoman Niš Eyalet. Most notable Governor of Niš Eyalet was Midhat Pasha, who later became Grand Vizier of Ottoman Empire.

Region of Southern Pomoravlje was finally liberated by Serbian forces during Serbian–Turkish Wars in 1878.

The Austro-Hungarian telegram on the declaration of war on Serbia was received by Prime Minister Nikola Pašić in Niš on 28 July 1914. This marked the official start of World War I. Niš was capital of Serbia from 1914 to 1915. In February 1917, Toplica Uprising broke out. The revolt was eventually suppressed by Bulgarian forces. Southern Serbia was liberated together with the rest of the country in 1918. Dimitrovgrad and Bosilegrad became part of newly founded Kingdom of Serbs, Croats and Slovenes according to the treaty of Neuilly-sur-Seine.

After the partition of Yugoslavia in World War II, municipalities of Vranje, Surdulica, Bosilegrad, Dimitrovgrad and Trgovište were annexed by Bulgaria, while the rest of the region became part of Serbia under the control of Government of National Salvation. The Jablanički okrug region was the scene of fierce fighting between the occupying forces and the Yugoslav Partisans. Southern Pomoravlje was liberated by Partisan, Soviet and Bulgaria forces in 1944.

During communist rule in Socialist Federal Republic of Yugoslavia, Southern Serbia went through extensive industrialization. In 1960, Niš University was founded. Today, Niš University has 11 faculties in Niš and a single faculty in Leskovac and Vranje. Academy of Vocational Studies of Southern Serbia was founded in 2019 in Leskovac.

After the end of Kosovo War, demilitarized buffer zone was established 5 km within the territory of Central Serbia. In this zone, in the municipalities of Preševo and Bujanovac, the so-called Liberation Army of Preševo, Medveđa and Bujanovac began to operate. This marked the beginning of the Insurgency in the Preševo Valley. The conflict between Albanian guerilla force and Serbian security forces lasted until 2001 and ended with Albanian defeat.

Geography

Subregions 

Southern Serbia consists of many subregions. Their names often came from names of the rivers. Most notable subregions are:

 Niško polje–valley in which the city of Niš is located.
 Toplica–named after the Toplica river. Prokuplje is the largest city in this region.
 Zaplanje–it largely coincides with the territory of the municipality of Gadžin Han. Translated into English it means Region Behind the Mountains.
 Šopluk–region whose borders are being debated. Origin of Shopska salad.
 Lužnica–region between Babušnica and Bela Palanka.
 Pusta Reka–located around Bojnik and named after Pusta river. Translated into English it means Deserted River.
 Visok–region on the slopes of Stara Planina.
 Inogošt–region around Surdulica. Named after medieval župa (county) of Inogošt.
 Jablanica–named after Jablanica river with the city of Leskovac as its center.
 Krajište and Znepolje–regions located in the furthermost southeast of Serbia around Bosilegrad.
Vlasina–region located east of South Morava river and south of Lužnica. Most notable feature of the region is Vlasina Lake.
Preševo Valley–controversial term used by Albanians in Preševo and Bujanovac.

Waters

Rivers 

Main river in Southern Serbia is South Morava. It passes through various gorges and valleys in Southern Serbia: Končulj gorge – Vranje valley – Grdelica gorge – Leskovac valley – Niš valley – Aleksinac valley – Stalać gorge. After breaking through the last, Stalać gorge, it meets the West Morava. Most important right tributary is Nišava. It flows through Niš and suburb of Niška Banja, Bela Palanka, Pirot and Dimitrovgrad. It is also the longest tributary of South Morava. City of Niš and Nišava District are named after the river of Nišava. Most notable feature of Nišava is Sićevo Gorge. Of the left tributaries of South Morava, most important are Jablanica and Toplica. Jablanica originates from the Goljak mountain and passes through the city of Leskovac. Jablanica District is named after Jablanica river. Toplica meets with South Morava near Doljevac, some 8 km southwest of Niš. Toplica originates on the slopes of Kopaonik mountain. It passes through the city of Prokuplje. District of Toplica is named after this river. River of Pčinja is a left tributary of Vardar. It is one of the rare rivers in Serbia that belongs to the Aegean Sea drainage basin.

Culture 

Southern Serbia was exposed to various historical influences over the history.

Dialect 

Inhabitants of Southern Serbia speak Torlakian dialect of Serbo-Croatian language. Majority of Serbian linguists call it Prizren-Timok dialect. It differs from the standard Serbian language in that it has three grammatical cases instead of seven, as well as full retention of the aorist and the imperfect, loss of infinitive as in Bulgarian and Macedonian, frequent stress on the final syllable in polysyllabic words, etc. Serbian authors Stevan Sremac and Borisav Stanković wrote several works in Torlakian dialect. Today, Torlakian dialect is preserved in its original form in rural parts of Southern Serbia. According to UNESCO's list of endangered languages, Torlakian is vulnerable.

Cuisine 
Burek is considered a traditional breakfast especially in Niš. The first burek in Niš was made in 1498 by the Turkish baker Mehmet Oğlu. Traditionally, Serbian barbeque from Leskovac and Niš is considered the best in Serbia.

Demography 
Southern Serbia is home to about 1,000,000 people. However, it is heavily affected by depopulation. Only Niš and Albanian majority municipalities of Preševo and Bujanovac saw population growth between 2002 and 2011. Municipalities east of South Morava river are in the most difficult situation. Best example is Municipality of Crna Trava that had around 13,500 residents in 1948 and now has around 1,500 residents. Depopulation is also present in municipalities of Dimitrovgrad and Bosilegrad, where Bulgarians form majority. Majority of Albanians boycotted the 2011 census. It is estimated that there are some 50,000 Albanians in Southern Serbia.

Largest cities

Districts, cities and municipalities

Economy 
Financial and economical center of Southern Serbia is Niš with 4,678 Euros GDP per capita. This makes it the 271st city in Europe by GDP per capita. Southern Serbia is considered as one of the poorest regions in Serbia. Furthermore, highest salaries are in Niš city municipality of Medijana and city of Pirot. Trgovište has lowest salary in Serbia. 

After experiencing rapid growth and industrialisation during

Southern Serbia is known for its tobacco industry. Tobacco factories are located in Niš(Philip Morris International), Vranje and Bujanovac. The company Philip Morris won the "Top Employer" award, which for the fifth time in a row took the position of one of the best employers in Serbia and the world.

In 2020 biggest exporters in Southern Serbia were Tigar Tyres from Pirot, Philip Morris International from Niš and Leoni AG from Prokuplje.

Transport 

Important corridors pass through Southern Serbia such as Pan-European Corridor X, that connects Europe with Middle East and Central Europe with Greece. Branches C and D meet in Niš. Branch C goes by Niš, Bela Palanka, Pirot and Dimitrovgrad, while Branch D goes by Niš, Doljevac, Leskovac, Vranje, Bujanovac and Preševo. International railways also follow this route. Serbia's second busiest airport, Constantine the Great Airport, is located in Niš.

Construction of highway between Niš and Priština, also known as Highway of Peace, started in December 2021.

Gallery

Notes 

 Albanians in Medvedja boycotted the 2011 census. It is estimated that there are some 50,000 Albanians in Southern Serbia.
 Albanians in Presevo and Bujanovac boycotted the 2011 census. It is estimated that there are some 50,000 Albanians in Southern Serbia.

References 

Geographical regions of Serbia
Toplica District
Pirot District
Jablanica District
Nišava District
Pčinja District